Jorge Morgenstern (born 23 September 1980) is a Chilean rower. He competed in the men's lightweight coxless four event at the 2000 Summer Olympics.

References

External links
 

1980 births
Living people
Chilean male rowers
Olympic rowers of Chile
Rowers at the 2000 Summer Olympics
People from Valdivia